Brandin Dandridge (born August 19, 1996) is a professional gridiron football defensive back for the Ottawa Redblacks of the Canadian Football League (CFL). He played college football at Missouri Western. He has also been a member of the Kansas City Chiefs of the NFL.

Early life and education
Dandridge was born on August 19, 1996, in Lee's Summit, Missouri, and grew up in Des Moines, Iowa. As a youth, he participated in Iowa in baseball, football, and basketball. He mainly played baseball, and later said that "there were people around the fences watching my tee-ball games because I was the only kid there that could hit over the fence home runs." Dandridge said that he "played everywhere in baseball, mainly in the outfield but played 3rd base, pitched and caught too." His family later moved to Missouri and he attended Blue Springs South High School there, playing baseball, football, and track.

Dandridge enrolled at Missouri Western State University, where he spent his first season (2014) as a football redshirt. As a freshman in 2015, he played in 11 games and recorded seven tackles as well as a forced fumble. He was a member of the starting lineup for every game (11) in 2016, and finished the season with a total of 50 tackles, 34 solo, and three interceptions. He also made 12 pass breakups and forced two fumbles, recovering one.

Dandridge earned third-team all-conference honors in 2017 after playing in all 11 games and placing second in the MIAA with four interceptions as well as 14 passes broken up. He produced 41 tackles, of which 29 were solo. He also played on special teams, making eight punt returns for 121 yards, which included a 52-yard return versus Missouri Southern.

Dandridge earned first-team all-conference honors as a returner and second-team as a cornerback in 2018. He led the team with four interceptions and led the conference in passes defended with 15. He started all 12 games and recorded 33 tackles in total, despite being hampered by a knee injury.

Professional career
In his final season at Missouri Western Dandridge's knee injury continued to got worse as the season progressed and led to him going undrafted in the NFL.

Ottawa Redblacks 

After recovering, Dandridge received his first opportunity in professional football at the June 2019 XFL showcase. Shortly afterwards, he was offered a contract to play in the Canadian Football League (CFL) by the Ottawa Redblacks. He started on the team's practice roster, being signed midway into the season, but was later promoted to the active roster for the year's final four games. In the four games, he recorded 12 tackles and defended two passes. The 2020 CFL season was canceled due to the COVID-19 pandemic. In , he was first signed to the practice roster, then released, then signed back to the practice roster and later promoted to the active roster in September. He played in the final eight games of the season for Ottawa, and made four interceptions for 19 yards and 12 tackles. On November 23, 2021, Dandridge was re-signed by the Redblacks. However, he was granted a release on February 7, 2022, to pursue NFL opportunities.

Kansas City Chiefs 
After tryouts with the Kansas City Chiefs Dandridge was signed to a reserve/futures contract by the Chiefs on February 7, 2022. He was waived on August 22, 2022.

Ottawa Redblacks (II) 
On September 6, 2022, Dandridge returned to the Ottawa Redblacks. He appeared in six games (starting five games at cornerback) to close out the season for the Redblacks, contributing with 14 tackles, two forced fumbles and one touchdown. On February 1, 2023, Dandridge and Ottawa agreed to a one-year contract extension.

References

1996 births
Living people
Players of American football from Missouri
American football cornerbacks
Missouri Western Griffons football players
Ottawa Redblacks players
Kansas City Chiefs players
Canadian football defensive backs